The Van Wouw House, was the last residence of the South African artist Anton Van Wouw.

Anton van Wouw (1862–1945)
Anton van Wouw was born in Driebergen, near Utrecht in the Netherlands on 26 December 1862. He had a thorough training in academic sculpture in Europe, initially in the studio of the Belgian sculptor Joseph Graven (1836–1877), later through evening classes at the Rotterdam Academie, and also working alongside other Stucco workers such as Vielvoije. The experience which he gained early in his life as a stucco-worker had a definite influence on his preference for the art of modelling.

African Studies by Anton Van Wouw

When Anton van Wouw arrived in South Africa from the Netherlands, he was twenty-eight years old.  Here he met the indigenous people of the country for the first time.  His rendering of Africans shows a perceptual awareness.  Not only does Van Wouw show the anatomical characteristics of the African, but he created these studies of the indigenous people with dignity and understanding. Spirit and culture come to the fore in these works. Van Wouw modelled from life and his subjects are shown in different moods and situations.  A serene and pensive mood is evident in his bronze sculpture, entitled The Thinker (1935).  With his chin resting on his hand, the subject seems unaware of the world around him, lost in his own thoughts.

A happy and joyful mood is created in the bronze work The Laughing Basutu (1936).  With his arms folded over his chest and head turned to the right, the subject seems happy and lively.  The play of light on the features adds to the liveliness of the work.

In the bronze work The Shangaan (1907) we see a reserved person.  He looks slightly down, the brow is furrowed and arms tightly crossed over his chest as if he is cutting himself off from the onlooker.

In The Sleeping African of 1907, the subject is totally relaxed, fast asleep with mouth open and head slightly tilted to the right.  The arms are lightly folded.  In contrast to this work, The Shangaan seems tense and worried. Calmness, serenity and almost a regal element are present in Zulu (1907).  A striking contrast is evident in the texture of hair and beard, as well as the smooth skin.  The man seems undisturbed by trivialities. He looks ahead with eyes cast slightly down, proud to be a Zulu.

Van Wouw created the African in his everyday activities as seen in The Hammer Worker (1911).  The worker is busy hammering at a rock and is almost encircled by rock.  The figure seems to ‘grow’ out of the rock.  The Skapu Player (1907) shows the African in a seated position relaxing while he plays his music.  The Mieliepap Eater (1907) shows the African preparing his food in a typical pose.  He sits stirring his food in the three-legged pot.

The Hunter Drinking (1907) shows the lithe body as nature's child.  The same horizontal composition is present in The Dagga Smoker (1907). With dignity and respect, Van Wouw sculptured King Khama, head of the Bamangwatu.  The wise old man stares ahead with tired eyes.  Old age and experience are evident in this work of Van Wouw. The model for The Bushman Hunter was well known to Van Wouw.  He actually worked for Van Wouw who studied his build and movements.  Van Wouw often played bow and arrow games with him.  His understanding of the small Bushman is quite evident in this work.

History of the Van Wouw House
The Van Wouw House, now the property of the University of Pretoria, was the last home and studio of the sculptor Anton van Wouw (1862-1945). The stand on which the house was built initially belonged to a Mr J Brookes.  The stand changed ownership three times and was sold to Van Wouw in 1937.  He commissioned the architect Norman Eaton to build a house for him on the southern property.

The Van Wouw House, which was completed in 1938, shows the personal style that Norman Eaton had already developed at the time.  The house was designed both as residence and studio. The unity between the building and the environment is conspicuous.  Van Wouw was a great lover of nature and a keen gardener and commissioned Eaton to design a residence with an affinity between architecture and nature.

An ornamental pool, and later on a lush garden, contributed to this link between home and nature.  The house itself was built with face brick, has a thatch roof and wooden window frames with shutters.  Terracotta tiles and wooden floors add further to its charm. The sound of water in the fishpond, climbing plants and lush gardens link the dwelling to the surrounding landscape.  From the large south-facing veranda, one has a lovely view to the south.

Van Wouw moved into his new home early in 1939 and lived there until his death on 30 June 1945.  Professor and Mrs S F Oosthuizen of the University of Pretoria then occupied the house until 1973.  During the 25th Annual General Meeting of the Rembrandt Group on 16 November 1973, Dr Anton Rupert announced that a sum of money equal to the selling price of the property had been given to the University of Pretoria to purchase the Van Wouw House.  Through this gesture, this valuable and exceptional house became the property of the university. Dr Rupert officially handed over the house to the University on 21 May 1974.

From about 1976 to 2008 the house was dedicated to being a museum for the artist, however in 2008 the University of Pretoria moved the museum contents to the Hatfield campus due to security problems as well as the access it provided for students. Today the House houses the Tangible Heritage Conservation Studio of the university where future conservators are trained.

External links

Anton van Wouw
Sculpture